Secrets is the fourth studio album of keyboardist Brian Culbertson released in 1997 on Mesa/Bluemoon/Atlantic Records. The album reached No. 15 on the Billboard Contemporary Jazz Albums chart and No. 20 on the Billboard Top Jazz Albums chart.

Track listing
Adapted from album's text.

References

1997 albums
Atlantic Records albums